Sico Pass is a mountain pass on the border between Argentina and Chile. The pass is located on the main divide of the Andes. Administratively, it separates the province of Salta in Argentina and the region of Antofagasta in Chile.

The pass is served by Chile Route 23, here a paved road, and Argentina Route 51, connecting San Pedro de Atacama on the Chilean side with Catua and San Antonio de los Cobres on the Argentinian side. The Chile Route 23 reaches an altitude of  24 km west of the border.

Gallery

References 

Mountain passes of Chile
Mountain passes of Argentina
Mountain passes of the Andes
Argentina–Chile border crossings
Landforms of Antofagasta Region
Landforms of Salta Province